Kleinia stapeliiformis is an evergreen succulent plant native to the Cape Provinces and Northern Provinces of South Africa. It is sometimes referred to as the "pickle plant" or (inaccurately) as the "pickle cactus", due to its form. It grows erect, leafless stems with soft spines, and displays a green-and-white pattern visually similar to a cucumber. It grows up to 30 cm tall, and displays red or orange flowers similar to those of a thistle in the summer.

References 

stapeliiformis